The 2017 1. divisjon (referred to as OBOS-ligaen for sponsorship reasons) was a Norwegian second-tier football league season.

The first round of the season was played on 2 April 2017 and the season concluded with the last round on 5 November 2017.

Team changes from 2016
In the 2016 1. divisjon, Kristiansund and Sandefjord were promoted to the 2017 Eliteserien, while Bryne, Hødd, KFUM Oslo and Raufoss were relegated to the 2017 2. divisjon.

Bodø/Glimt and Start were relegated from the 2016 Tippeligaen, while Tromsdalen, Elverum, Florø and Arendal were promoted from the 2016 2. divisjon.

Teams

Managerial changes

League table

Results

Promotion play-offs

The third to sixth-placed teams took part in the promotion play-offs; these were single leg knockout matches, two semi-finals and a final. The winners, Ranheim, advanced to play the 14th placed team in Eliteserien over two legs in the Eliteserien play-offs for a spot in the top-flight next season.

Semi-finals

Final

Relegation play-offs

The 14th placed team took part in a two-legged play-off against Notodden, the winners of the 2. divisjon play-offs, to decide who would play in the 2018 OBOS-ligaen.

Notodden won 5–3 on aggregate.

Season statistics

Top scorers

Most assists

References

Norwegian First Division seasons
1
Norway